Donald Ray Smith (September 17, 1924 – July 8, 2022), better known as Donnie "Beezer" Smith, was an American child actor. He appeared in the Our Gang film short series during the silent Pathé era, playing the role of Beezer between 1928 and 1929.

Life and career
Smith was born in Kern County, California on September 17, 1924. The son of a labourer, he was one of five siblings. His older brother, Jay R. Smith, appeared in the Our Gang short films between 1925 and 1929.

His Our Gang credits include Fair and Muddy (1928), Little Mother (1929), Boxing Gloves (1929), and Cat, Dog & Co. (1929).

Smith died in Dade City, Florida on July 8, 2022, at the age of 97. At the time of his death, Smith was one of three known surviving actors from the silent film era, along with Mildred Kornman (1925–2022) and Garry Watson (born 1928).

References

External links 

1924 births
2022 deaths
20th-century American male actors
American male child actors
American male silent film actors
Hal Roach Studios actors
People from Kern County, California